Acronicta falcula, the corylus dagger moth, is a moth of the family Noctuidae. The species was first described by Augustus Radcliffe Grote in 1877. It is found in the United States and Canada from southern New England to southern Manitoba and Iowa. Recently seen from Wisconsin, Connecticut, Rhode Island, New York and Michigan. It is reported as rare in Ohio. It is listed as a species of special concern in the US state of Connecticut.

The wingspan is about 42 mm. There are probably two generations in about May and July to August in most of its range.

The larvae feed on the foliage of Corylus species.

Taxonomy
Acronicta mansueta Smith, 1897 and Acronicta parallela Grote, 1879 were placed as synonyms of Acronicta falcula, but later reinstated as valid species.

References

External links
"Acronicta falcula Corylus Dagger Moth". NatureServe Explorer. 
"Acronicta falcula Corylus dagger moth". Rare Species Explorer.

Acronicta
Moths of North America
Moths described in 1877